Nicolae Mărăscu (July 1, 1898 –  1938) was a Romanian rugby union footballer. Born in Bucharest, he played as a centre.

Mărăscu had 5 caps for the newcomer Romania, without ever scoring, since his first match, in 1919, a 48–5 loss to France XV, in Paris, for the Inter-Allied Games, and his last, at 22 May 1927, in a 21–5 win over Czechoslovakia, in Bratislava.

The highest point of Mărăscu career was at the 1924 Olympic Tournament, when Romania, even losing to France (59–3) and the United States (39–0) still won the bronze medal by finishing in 3rd place. Mărăscu was the captain of the Romanian team. It was the last time that rugby union appeared at the Olympic Games.

He played in France for Stade Français and Olympique lillois.

See also
 List of Romania national rugby union players

References

External links
 
 
 

1898 births
1938 deaths
Romanian rugby union players
Rugby union centres
Stade Français players
Olympic rugby union players of Romania
Rugby union players at the 1924 Summer Olympics
Olympic bronze medalists for Romania
Romania international rugby union players
Medalists at the 1924 Summer Olympics